Rudy Rogiers (born 17 February 1961) is a Belgian former professional racing cyclist. He rode in four editions of the Tour de France, one edition of the Giro d'Italia and one edition of the Vuelta a España.

References

External links

1961 births
Living people
Belgian male cyclists
People from Wetteren
Cyclists from East Flanders